General Bipin Rawat  (16 March 1958 – 8 December 2021) was an Indian military officer who was a four-star general of the Indian Army. He served as the first Chief of Defence Staff (CDS) of the Indian Armed Forces from January 2020 until his death in a helicopter crash in December 2021. Prior to taking over as the CDS, he served as the 57th Chairman of the Chiefs of Staff Committee (Chairman COSC) of the Indian Armed Forces as well as 26th Chief of the Army Staff (COAS) of the Indian Army.

Born in Pauri, Pauri Garhwal district in present-day Uttarkhand to Lieutenant General Lakshman Singh Rawat, he graduated from the National Defence Academy and the Indian Military Academy where he was awarded the Sword of Honour. He was commissioned into his father's unit - 11 Gorkha Rifles. He served during the 1987 Sino-Indian skirmish in the Sumdorong Chu valley. He commanded a company in Uri and his battalion - 5/11 GR along the Line of Actual Control in Arunachal Pradesh. Promoted to the rank of Brigadier, he commanded 5 sector Rashtriya Rifles in Sopore. He subsequently served with the United Nations as the Commander of a Multinational Brigade as part of MONUSCO. 

Promoted to general officer, Rawat commanded the 19 Infantry Division at Uri. He then served as the Major General General Staff (MGGS) at Headquarters Eastern Command. In 2014, he was promoted to the rank of Lieutenant General and appointed General officer commanding (GOC) III Corps at Dimapur. During this tenure, the 2015 Indian counter-insurgency operation in Myanmar took place where units under his command executed cross-border strikes against the NSCN-K. In early 2016, Rawat was promoted to Army Commander grade and appointed General Officer Commanding-in-Chief Southern Command. After a short stint, he moved to Army HQ as the Vice Chief of the Army Staff. In December that year, he was appointed the next Chief of the Army Staff superseding two senior generals. As the senior-most chief of staff amongst the three services, he served as the Chairman of the Chiefs of Staff Committee  of the Indian Armed Forces from September to December 2019.

Early life and education 
Bipin Rawat was born in Pauri town of Pauri Garhwal district, present-day Uttarakhand state, on 16 March 1958  to a Hindu Garhwali Rajput family. His family had been serving in the Indian Army for multiple generations. His father Lakshman Singh Rawat (1930–2015) was from Sainj village of the Pauri Garhwal district; commissioned into 11 Gorkha Rifles in 1951, he retired as Deputy Chief of the Army Staff in 1988 as a Lieutenant General. His mother was from the Uttarkashi district and was the daughter of Kishan Singh Parmar, the ex-Member of the Legislative Assembly (MLA) from Uttarkashi.

Rawat was educated at Cambrian Hall school in Dehradun and at the St. Edward's School, Shimla. He then joined the National Defence Academy, Khadakwasla and the Indian Military Academy, Dehradun, from where he graduated first in the order of merit and was awarded the 'Sword of Honour'.

Rawat was also a graduate of the Defence Services Staff College (DSSC), Wellington and the Higher Command Course at the United States Army Command and General Staff College (USACGSC) at Fort Leavenworth, Kansas in 1997. From his tenure at the DSSC, he obtained an MPhil degree in Defence Studies as well as diplomas in Management and Computer Studies from the University of Madras. In 2011, he was awarded an honorary doctorate by Chaudhary Charan Singh University, Meerut for his research on military-media strategic studies.

Military career

Early career 
Rawat was commissioned into the 5th battalion, the 11 Gorkha Rifles (5/11 GR) on 16 December 1978, the same unit as his father. During the 1987 Sino-Indian skirmish in the Sumdorong Chu valley,  then Captain Rawat's battalion was deployed against the Chinese People's Liberation Army. The standoff was the first military confrontation along the disputed McMahon Line after the 1962 war. 

Early in his career, Rawat had an instructional tenure at the Indian Military Academy, Dehradun. He had much experience in high-altitude warfare and spent ten years conducting counter-insurgency operations. He commanded a company in Uri, Jammu and Kashmir as a Major. He attended the Defence Services Staff College, Wellington. After the course, he was appointed General Staff Officer, Grade 2 (GSO2) at the Military Operations Directorate at Army headquarters. He also served as a logistics staff officer of a Re-organised Army Plains Infantry Division (RAPID) in Central India. He attended the Higher Command Course at the United States Army Command and General Staff College (USACGSC) at Fort Leavenworth, Kansas.

As a Colonel, Rawat commanded his battalion, the 5th battalion, the 11 Gorkha Rifles, in the eastern sector along the Line of Actual Control at Kibithu. For his command of 5/11 GR, he was awarded the Vishisht Seva Medal on 26 January 2001. He also served as Colonel Military Secretary (Col MS) and Deputy Military Secretary in the Military Secretary’s Branch and as a Senior Instructor in the Junior Command Wing.

On 26 January 2005, he was awarded the Sena Medal for devotion to duty. Promoted to the rank of Brigadier, he commanded 5 Sector Rashtriya Rifles in Sopore. He was awarded the Yudh Seva Medal for his command of 5 Sector RR.

UN mission in Congo 
Rawat commanded MONUSCO (a Multinational Brigade in a Chapter VII mission in the Democratic Republic of the Congo). Within two weeks of deployment in the DRC, the Brigade faced a major offensive in the east which threatened the regional capital of North Kivu, Goma. The offensive also threatened to destabilise the country as a whole. The situation demanded a rapid response and North Kivu Brigade was reinforced, where it was responsible for over 7,000 men and women, representing nearly half of the total MONUSCO force. Whilst simultaneously engaged in offensive kinetic operations against the CNDP and other armed groups, Rawat (then Brigadier) carried out tactical support to the Congolese Army (FARDC), He sensitised programmes with the local population and detailed coordination to ensure that all were informed about the situation and worked together in the progress of operations. He was responsible for the protection of the vulnerable population.

This operational period  lasted for four months. Goma never fell, the East stabilized and the main armed group was motivated to the negotiating table and has since been integrated into the FARDC. He was also tasked to present the Revised Charter of Peace Enforcement to the Special Representatives of the Secretary-General and Force Commanders of all the UN missions in a special conference at Wilton Park, London, on 16 May 2009. Rawat was twice awarded the Force Commander’s Commendation.

General officer 
After promotion to Major General, Rawat took over as the General Officer Commanding 19th Infantry Division (Uri). For his command of the Dagger Division, as the 19th Infantry Division is called, he was awarded the Ati Vishisht Seva Medal on 26 January 2013. He subsequently served as the Major General General Staff (MGGS) of the Eastern Command.

2015 Myanmar strikes 

Promoted to the rank of Lieutenant General, he was appointed General Officer Commanding III Corps, headquartered in Dimapur. In June 2015, eighteen Indian soldiers were killed in an ambush by militants belonging to the United Liberation Front of Western South East Asia (UNLFW) in Manipur. The Indian Army responded with cross-border strikes in which units of the 21st battalion of the Parachute Regiment struck an NSCN-K base in Myanmar. 21 Para was under the operational control of the Dimapur based III Corps, which was then commanded by Rawat. For his command of III Corps, he was awarded the Uttam Yudh Seva Medal on 26 January 2016.

Army Commander 
After relinquishing command of III Corps, Rawat was appointed General Officer Commanding Maharashtra, Gujarat and Goa Area, headquartered in Mumbai.
After a short stint, he was promoted to the Army Commander grade and assumed the post of General Officer Commanding-in-Chief (GOC-in-C) Southern Command on 1 January 2016. After an eight-month tenure, he assumed the post of Vice Chief of the Army Staff on 1 September 2016.

Chief of the Army Staff 

On 17 December 2016, the Government of India appointed Rawat as the 27th Chief of the Army Staff, superseding two more senior Lieutenant Generals, Praveen Bakshi and P. M. Hariz. The appointment made by NDA ruled Government was politically controversial. Rawat was accused of nepotism and gratuitously politicising the appointment, by the senior serving and retired military officers.

He took office of Chief of the Army Staff as the 27th COAS on 31 December 2016, after retirement of General Dalbir Singh Suhag. He was the third officer from the Gorkha Brigade to become the Chief of the Army Staff, after Sam Manekshaw and Suhag.

In 2018, Rawat defended the army Major involved in the Kashmir human shield incident, where a Kashmiri man was tied to a jeep as a human shield. The officer was awarded a Chief of the Army Staff Commendation Card by Rawat for counter-insurgency operations.

Rawat had been criticized by the opposition party leaders for making political statements during the Citizenship Amendment Act protests.

On his visit to the United States in 2019, General Rawat was inducted to the United States Army Command and General Staff College International Hall of Fame. He was also an honorary General of Nepalese Army in accordance with the tradition between the Indian and Nepali armies to confer the honorary rank of General upon each other's chiefs to signify their close and special military ties.

Rawat served as the 57th Chairman of the Chiefs of Staff Committee.

Doklam standoff with Chinese army 
In 2017, at Doklam a 73-day military border standoff happened between the Indian Armed Forces and the People's Liberation Army of China over Chinese construction of a road in Doklam near a trijunction border area between Bhutan, China and India. After the standoff ended Rawat said China had begun 'flexing its muscles' and was trying to 'nibble away' territory held by India in a gradual manner to test the limits of thresholds. He stated, India had to be "wary about" China, "and remain prepared for situations that could develop into conflicts".

On Pakistan 
Rawat said that India did not "see any scope for reconciliation with Pakistan as its military, polity and people have decided that India wants to break their country into pieces". Rawat suspected Pakistan could "swing into action to take advantage of India’s preoccupation with China". Rawat thus highlighted a two-front war situation without offering a solution or remedy.

Two front War 
Until 2019, Rawat had given statements warning India to be prepared for a simultaneous war on two fronts against China and Pakistan. In September 2017, during a seminar in Delhi, Rawat said that "warfare lies within the realm of reality" along India borders with China and Pakistan, even though all the three countries have nuclear arms. According to critics, Rawat neither prepared for such an outcome nor initiated measures to thwart it.

Bilateral visits as Chief of the Army Staff

Chief of Defence Staff 

He served as the first Chief of Defence Staff (CDS) of the Indian Armed Forces from January 2020 until his death in December 2021.

India as of 2021 had service–specific commands system. joint and integrated commands, also known as unified commands; and further divided into theatre or functional commands, have been set up and more are proposed. In February 2020, Rawat said two to five theatre commands may be set up. The completion of the creation of theatre commands, both integrated and joint commands, will take a number of years. Indian Air Force opposed the formation of unified theatre commands citing limitation of resources.

Comments on supremacy of Army 
Rawat put emphasis on the 'supremacy and primacy' of the Indian Army over the Air force and Navy, in fighting wars. Rawat had stated, "Wars will be fought on land, and therefore the primacy of the army must be maintained over the air force and navy. The statement had antagonised the Air Force and Navy.

In early 2021, Rawat called the Indian Air Force a "supporting arm" of India's defence network and infrastructure. Air Chief Marshal R. K. S. Bhadauria made a public statement in response that the IAF served a bigger role than a supporting arm.

Ladakh standoff with Chinese Army

Comments on China 
On 15 September 2021 while speaking at an event in the capacity of the CDS at the India International Centre in New Delhi, General Rawat touched upon the theory of clash of civilisations with regards to the western civilisation and China's growing relations with countries like Iran and Turkey. The next day, on 16 September 2021, India's Minister of External Affairs S. Jaishankar conveyed to his Chinese counterpart that India does not subscribe to any clash of civilisations theory.

Personal life 

In 1985, Rawat married Madhulika Rawat (née Raje Singh). A descendant of an erstwhile princely family, she was the daughter of Kunwar Mrigendra Singh, sometime Riyasatdar of the pargana of Sohagpur Riyasat in Shahdol district and an Indian National Congress MLA from the district in 1967 and 1972. She was educated at Scindia Kanya Vidyalaya in Gwalior and graduated in psychology at University of Delhi. The couple had two daughters, Kritika and Tarini.

Madhulika Rawat was the president of the Army Wives Welfare Association (AWWA) during Bipin Rawat's tenure as Chief of the Army Staff. She became the president of the Defence Wives Welfare Association (DWWA), upon the creation of the post and the appointment of General Bipin Rawat as the first CDS. She worked to make the wives of defence personnel financially independent. She was also involved with NGOs and welfare associations such as Veer Naris that assists widows of military personnel, differently-abled children and cancer patients.

Death and legacy

On 8 December 2021, Rawat, his wife and members of his staff were amongst 10 passengers and 4 crew members aboard an Indian Air Force Mil Mi-17 helicopter flight en route from the Sulur Air Force Base to the Defence Services Staff College (DSSC), Wellington, where Rawat was to deliver a lecture. At around 12:10 p.m. local time, the aircraft crashed near a residential colony of private tea estate employees on the outskirts of the hamlet of Nanjappachatiram, Bandishola panchayat, in the Katteri-Nanchappanchathram area of Coonoor taluk, Nilgiris district. Rawat's death – and those of his wife and 11 others – was later confirmed by the Indian Air Force. Rawat's liaison officer, Group Captain Varun Singh initially survived the incident, but later succumbed to injuries on 15 December. Rawat was 63 at the time of his death.

Rawat and his wife were cremated according to Hindu rituals with full military honours and 17 gun salute at Brar Square Crematorium in Delhi Cantonment on 10 December 2021. Their cremation was carried out by their daughters, who took their ashes to Haridwar and immersed them in the Ganges at the Har Ki Pauri ghat on 12 December.

On Rawat's first death anniversary, his bust was unveiled at the United Service Institution of India (USI) by the Minister of State for Defence Ajay Bhatt. A chair of excellence and a memorial lecture was instituted at the institute by the Indian Armed Forces and the USI. The General Bipin Rawat Block at the Military Engineer Services Inspection Bungalow (MES IB) in Colaba, Mumbai is named for Rawat.
The General Rawat India-Australia Young Defence Officers’ Exchange Programme established in March 2022 is named for Rawat. The programme is aimed at enhancing professional military contacts between the two armed forces and facilitate the exchange of ideas and operational experiences.

On Rawat's 65th birth anniversary, the Indian Navy instituted the General Bipin Rawat rolling trophy for the Woman Agniveer Trainee standing First in Overall Order of Merit. The trophy was instituted to honour his contribution to transformational Agnipath Scheme and is presented at the sailors training centre INS Chilka. The Navy also instituted the General Bipin Rawat Rolling trophy for the Most Spirited Officer undergoing the Naval Higher Command Course (NHCC) at the Naval War College, Goa.

Honours and decorations 
During his career of nearly 43 years, he was awarded mulitple time for gallantry and distinguished service. He was awarded the Vishisht Seva Medal in 2001, the Sena Medal in 2005, the Yudh Seva Medal in 2009, the Ati Vishisht Seva Medal in 2013, the Uttam Yudh Seva Medal in 2016 and the Param Vishisht Seva Medal in 2019. He was also awarded the COAS Commendation on two occasions and the Army Commander’s Commendation. While serving with the United Nations, he was awarded the Force Commander's commendation twice. He was posthumously honoured with the Padma Vibhushan in the 2022 Republic Day honours list.

Dates of rank

References

Further reading

External links 
Guard of honour during the handover ceremony in 2019

1958 births
2021 deaths
Indian generals
Military personnel from Uttarakhand
People from Uttarakhand
People from Pauri Garhwal district
Garhwali people
Chiefs of Defence Staff (India)
Chiefs of Army Staff (India)
Vice Chiefs of Army Staff (India)
National Defence College, India alumni
Non-U.S. alumni of the Command and General Staff College
Defence Services Staff College alumni
Indian Military Academy alumni
National Defence Academy (India) alumni
Recipients of the Padma Vibhushan in civil service
Recipients of the Param Vishisht Seva Medal
Recipients of the Uttam Yudh Seva Medal
Recipients of the Ati Vishisht Seva Medal
Recipients of the Yudh Seva Medal
Recipients of the Sena Medal
Recipients of the Vishisht Seva Medal
University of Madras alumni
Chaudhary Charan Singh University alumni
Victims of aviation accidents or incidents in 2021
Victims of aviation accidents or incidents in India
Victims of helicopter accidents or incidents